Haplochrois guttata is a moth in the family Elachistidae. It is found in Panama.

References

Natural History Museum Lepidoptera generic names catalog

Elachistidae
Moths of Central America